The 2018 Baku FIA Formula 2 round was a pair of motor races for Formula 2 cars that took place on 28 and 29 April 2018 at the Baku Street Circuit in Baku, Azerbaijan as part of the FIA Formula 2 Championship. It was the second round of the 2018 FIA Formula 2 Championship and runs in support of the 2018 Azerbaijan Grand Prix.

Classification

Qualifying

Notes
  – Santino Ferrucci was disqualified for failing to comply with the minimum tyre pressure and was permitted to start the following day's feature race.
  – Both BWT Arden cars were disqualified for going over the maximum allowable team personnel associated and were permitted to start the following day's feature race.
  – Nicholas Latifi failed to set a time within the 107% required and raced at the stewards' discretion.

Feature race

Notes
  – Lando Norris and Tadasuke Makino and Jack Aitken started from pit lane after stalling on the grid.

Sprint race

Notes
  – Sérgio Sette Câmara was disqualified as a result of having insufficient fuel to return to the pits.

Championship standings after the round

Drivers' Championship standings

Teams' Championship standings

Notes

References

External links
 

Baku
Formula 2